Hersek headland is a headland in Turkey.

Geography 
It is an Anatolian headland pointing north to Gulf of İzmit which is a part of Marmara Sea. Although the average width of the gulf is about  the width at the north of Hersek headland is only

History 
The strategic importance of the headland was noticed by the Roman emperor Constantine I who founded the town of Helenopolis. Later during the First Crusade, Seljuk sultan Kılıç Arslan I defeated people's crusades in the battle of Civetot near Helenopolis.
Hersek headland is also known as the place where the Ottoman Empire (then only a principality) proclaimed independence. On 27 July 1302, Ottoman armies defeated Byzantine armies which tried to relieve the city of Nicea (modern İznik)  from Ottoman siege in the battle of Koyunhisar.
After this battle Osman I declared the independence of his principality.

Bridge Project 
The İzmit Bay Bridge is under construction between Hersek headland and Dilovası on the opposite side of the gulf. According to official statement, the bridge will be  and the present İstanbul-İzmir highway distance to will be shortened by

References

Headlands of Turkey
Marmara Region
Landforms of Yalova Province